The Centre Cannot Hold may refer to:

"the centre cannot hold", a phrase from the poem "The Second Coming" by William Butler Yeats
The Centre Cannot Hold (album), a 2017 album by Ben Frost
American Empire: The Center Cannot Hold, a novel by Harry Turtledove
The Centre Cannot Hold, an EP by Digitonal
The Center Cannot Hold: My Journey Through Madness, a book by Elyn Saks
The Centre Cannot Hold, a novel by Mike W. Barr
The Centre Cannot Hold, a novel by Brian Stableford